"The Bug" is a song written by Mark Knopfler and originally performed by Dire Straits on the final studio album by the band, On Every Street (1991). It was covered by Mary Chapin Carpenter in 1992, and also recorded on the albums Blues Ballads (1996) by The Alex Bollard Assembly and Keep Your Hands to Yourself (2002) by Mike Berry & The Outlaws.

Dire Straits
The song is the fourth and final UK single from the album On Every Street by English rock band Dire Straits, and it also was to be Dire Straits' final single release in the UK. Other songs from the album were released as singles in selected countries ("You and Your Friend" in France and Germany or "Ticket to Heaven" in Netherlands).

Track listings
7-inch vinyl single
 "The Bug"
 "Twisting by the Pool"

5-inch CD single
 "The Bug" 
 "Twisting by the Pool"
 "Expresso Love"
 "Walk of Life"

Mary Chapin Carpenter

The song was covered by Mary Chapin Carpenter on her 1992 album Come On Come On, and was released as a single the next year, peaking at 16 on Billboard's Hot Country Singles & Tracks. This version of the song is also included on the soundtrack of the 2006 computer animated film Everyone's Hero.

Charts

References

1992 singles
1993 singles
Dire Straits songs
Mary Chapin Carpenter songs
Songs written by Mark Knopfler
Song recordings produced by Steve Buckingham (record producer)
Columbia Records singles
Song recordings produced by Mark Knopfler
1991 songs
Vertigo Records singles
Music videos directed by Stephen R. Johnson